José Pedro Ferreira Oliveira (born 6 April 2002) is a Portuguese professional footballer who plays as a goalkeeper for F.C. Paços de Ferreira.

Club career
Born in Penafiel, Porto District, Oliveira joined F.C. Paços de Ferreira's academy at the age of 13. He made his competitive and Primeira Liga debut with the first team on 24 July 2020, playing one minute as a substitute in a 3–3 away draw against Gil Vicente F.C. which was the last match of the season.

Oliveira was loaned to third division club A.D. Sanjoanense on 10 September 2021.

Career statistics

Club

Notes

References

External links

2002 births
Living people
People from Penafiel
Sportspeople from Porto District
Portuguese footballers
Association football goalkeepers
Primeira Liga players
Campeonato de Portugal (league) players
F.C. Paços de Ferreira players
A.D. Sanjoanense players
Portugal youth international footballers